The Courtyard Speech (Swedish: Borggårdstalet) was a speech written by conservative explorer Sven Hedin and Swedish Army lieutenant Carl Bennedich, delivered by King Gustaf V of Sweden to the participants of the Peasant armament support march at the courtyard of the Royal Palace in Stockholm. 

The speech sparked the Courtyard Crisis in Swedish government in February 1914.

Context
The speech was a part in the organized expressions of Swedish conservatives who criticized the liberal Prime Minister Karl Staaff's decision to lower military spending, particularly the decision not to proceed with the construction of a coastal battleship for the Swedish Navy (then known as the "F-ship", which later became the Sverige-class coastal defence ship), which had been decided upon by the previous right wing government headed by Arvid Lindman. Before World War I, modernisation of navies and introduction of Dreadnought-style heavy warships stood at the forefront of naval technology at the time, and the issue generally received a lot of public attention.

Speech
The speech was written by Sven Hedin and Lieutenant Carl Bennedich, well before the date of the planned peasant armament support march. The speech was reviewed by several members of the political elite before it was delivered. Hedin showed the speech to the leader of the conservatives in the first chamber, who later became Conservative Prime Minister Ernst Trygger; he considered the speech to be brilliant even though he was not sure what the political consequences would be if the speech was delivered by the King. The Conservative politician and previous Prime Minister Arvid Lindman and the future Independent Liberal Prime Minister Gerhard Louis De Geer thought that the speech could lead to a constitutional crisis between the King and the members of the Council of State. Prime Minister Karl Staaff was not allowed to see the speech on before it was delivered by the King.

The speech was read by Gustav V on the inner courtyard of the Royal Palace as the protestors of the support march had reached the palace. For those of the 30,000 march participants who could not fit the inner courtyard, the speech was immediately read again by Crown Prince Gustaf Adolf and Prince Carl.

The initial line of the speech, I redlige män af Sveriges bondestam!, "Ye honest men of Sweden's yeomanry tribe" remains, because of its archaic grammar and choice of words and because of the political implications and importance of the speech, a famous quote in Swedish politics.

References

1914 in Sweden
1914 in politics
Political history of Sweden
1910s in Stockholm
1914 speeches
Conservatism in Sweden